The Super One National Kart Championships, also known as S1 or Super One, is a karting championship based in the United Kingdom. It has been in operation since 1983 and is regarded as the premier karting championship in the UK, producing professional drivers including Lewis Hamilton, Jenson Button, David Coulthard, Alexander Albon, Dan Wheldon, Anthony Davidson, Jason Plato, Zhou Guanyu and more.

History
The first Super 1 meeting was held in 1983 at Snetterton where only four classes were run as part of the championship. At the time, the championship was not officially recognised as being the "British Championship" as the RAC national titles were decided over a one-weekend event. This continued up till 1990 when Super 1 secured the rights to decide the British champion over the course of the series.

Over the years, the Super 1 series has produced champions that have gone on to race in Formula 1 such as David Coulthard, Will Stevens, Allan McNish, Jenson Button, Anthony Davidson, Paul di Resta, Ralph Firman and Lewis Hamilton. Other drivers who have won a Super 1 championship and who have gone on to professional motor racing include Gary Paffett, Mike Conway, Dan Wheldon, Ben Hanley, Oliver Jarvis, Oliver Rowland and Billy Monger.

Caleb McDuff became the first ever profoundly deaf driver to take a podium finish in 2019, finishing 2nd at Rowrah. He went on to finish the season in first place in the championship, winning the Honda Cadet class 

Another Notable driver who now competes in the Formula E Championship after a controversial racing career is Dan Ticktum, who won the Bamford Kart Club Winter Series in 2008 while also competing in the Super 1 National kart Championship, coming in 11th place against the likes of Connor Mills who came in 2nd that year, (91 points ahead of 11th place Dan Ticktum) who in 2012 won the Super 1 National Minimax Kart Championship, narrowly beating F1 driver Lando Norris.

Classes
Originally, there were only four classes in the Super 1 series. In 2017, 11 different classes ran within the series over 11 different race weekends.

Bambino classes 

For drivers from 6 years of age up to the year of their 8th birthday.

Bambino

Cadet classes 

For drivers from 8 years of age up to and including the year of their 13th birthday.

IAME Cadet
Honda Cadet
Mini Rok

Junior classes 

For drivers from 12 years of age up to and including the year of their 17th birthday.

Minimax
Junior Rotax 
Junior TKM
Junior X30 
Junior OK 
Rok

Senior classes 

For drivers over 16 years of age.

Rotax Max Challenge 177
TKM Extreme 
Senior X30 
Senior OK 
KZ 
Rok

References

External links
Official website for the Super 1 Series
list of all S1 champions since 1983